Kaleemullah Khan may refer to:
 Kaleemullah Khan (field hockey) (born 1958), Pakistani field hockey player
 Kaleemullah Khan (footballer) (born 1992), Pakistani footballer